HMS Maidstone was a 50-gun fourth rate ship of the line of the Royal Navy, built at Rotherhithe to the dimensions laid down in the 1741 proposals of the 1719 Establishment, and launched on 12 October 1744.

Maidstone had a short life, being wrecked in 1747.

Notes

References

Lavery, Brian (2003) The Ship of the Line - Volume 1: The development of the battlefleet 1650-1850. Conway Maritime Press. .

Ships of the line of the Royal Navy
1744 ships
Maritime incidents in 1747